Jean-Baptiste Fossin (1786–1848) was a French silver and goldsmith and jeweler.

Life and career
The French house of luxurious jewelry Chaumet was founded in 1780 by Marie-Etienne Nitot in Paris. Nitot was appointed the Emperor's jeweler in 1802 and designed the coronation crown and the Imperial Sword. After the fall of Napoleon, Nitot and his son sold their business to their foreman, master craftsmen John-Baptiste Fossin. Fossin and his son Jules became noted for romantic jewelry inspired by Italian Renaissance and nature motifs including vine leaves, fruit and hawthorne, and successfully established a noble clientele.

Fossin's son Jules formed a partnership with Jean-Valentin Morel to set up a jewelry business in London. The daughter of Morel's son Prosper married Joseph Chaumet, who inherited the family jewelry business in 1885.

References

1786 births
1848 deaths
French silversmiths
French jewellers
French goldsmiths
19th-century French businesspeople